The Cité internationale des arts is an artist-in-residence building complex which accommodates artists of all specialities and nationalities in Paris. It comprises two sites, one located in the Marais and the other in Montmartre. Approximately 1200 artists, choreographers, musicians, writers and designers from around the world live and work in the Cité internationale des arts every year. Residencies are generally a year long.

History and description 

The Cité internationale des arts was a Franco-Scandinavian idea proposed by the Finnish artist Eero Snellman (1890-1951) during a speech at the 1937 Exposition Internationale des Arts et Techniques dans la Vie Moderne. It was only after the Second World War that this idea was taken up by Mr. and Mrs. Félix Brunau and became a real project. It took the form of an association created in 1947 which benefited from the support of the Ministry of Culture and the Ministry of Foreign Affairs as well as the Academy of Fine Arts and the City of Paris. It had its first headquarters at the Ministry of Culture on rue de Valois before moving to 18 rue de l'Hôtel de Ville in the 4th arrondissement, the City of Paris having granted an emphyteutic lease for the construction of a set of live-work spaces.

Opened 1956, Inaugurated in 1965, the Cité internationale des arts offers residency workshops known as "living workshops" designed for work and housing, located at two main sites. One, located in the Marais (rue de l'Hôtel-de-Ville opposite île Saint-Louis) includes the first building from 1965 as well as buildings whose renovation was completed in 1995, while the second is located in Montmartre, at 16 rue Girardon.

The Marais location site was the work of architects Paul Tournon, Ngo Viet Thu and Olivier-Clément Cacoub.

Cultural programmes
For nearly half a century, the Brunaus ran and developed the Cité internationale des arts. By establishing a cultural programme and privatising its spaces (auditorium, gallery), this structure can host events organised either with the artists in residence, or partner and non-partner structures of the Foundation. The Cité internationale des arts also has collective workshops for visual artists and rehearsal studios for musicians. Its residency programs are aimed at French and foreign artists who wish to work in Paris. The Foundation has accommodated more than 15,000 artists since its foundation.

References

External links 
 on Commons
 Official website

Arts in Paris
Arts centres in France
Buildings and structures in the 4th arrondissement of Paris
Buildings and structures completed in 1965
1965 establishments in France
Arts foundations based in Europe